Pickly Dred Rhizzoms is an EP by German electronica band Mouse on Mars. It was released on 3 May 1999 by Sonig and Thrill Jockey. It features experiments with glitch and techno further present on band's previous and next albums Autoditacker, Glam and Niun Niggung. EP uses more acoustic instrumentation, polyrythms and breakbeats.

Track listing
All tracks written and composed by Jan St. Werner and Andi Toma, except where noted:

On some versions "Pickly Dred Rhizzoms" is placed as last track.

Personnel 
 Composers: Jan St. Werner, Andi Toma, Dodo NKishi

References

External links
 

1999 EPs
Mouse on Mars albums
Thrill Jockey EPs